The discography of Yeasayer, an American experimental rock band, consists of five studio albums, eighteen singles, two live albums and four extended plays (EPs).

Yeasayer's first album All Hour Cymbals was released in 2007 to critical praise. In 2010 the band released the critically acclaimed Odd Blood with the album scoring the group's first chart success around the world. The album produced several world charting singles such as "Ambling Alp", "O.N.E." and "Madder Red". In late 2011 the band started work on their third album Fragrant World. The album was released in the summer of 2012 and gave the band their biggest hit album. Charting in the top 50 in many countries and peaking number 44 on the Billboard 200, the album is the band's highest charting album in the US to date.

Following the band's third album, Yeasayer started recording for their fourth album Amen & Goodbye. The album was delayed heavily due to a storm that had destroyed much of the recording tapes. It was released in 2016 after a four-year gap between albums, the longest in the band's career. The group's fifth album Erotic Reruns was released on June 7, 2019 and was the first album to release on the band's own imprint label "Yeasayer Records"

Albums

Studio albums

Live albums

Extended plays

Singles

Other appearances

Music videos

Notes

References

External links 

Discographies of American artists
Rock music group discographies
Alternative rock discographies